An edematous areola is a swollen and tender inflammation of the areola of the breast. It can develop after childbirth when large amounts of fluids are given intravenously, use of pitocin or fluid retention for other reasons, and may interfere with successful initiation of breastfeeding. An edematous areola can also develop in women with preeclampsia.

See also

Breast milk
Nipple prosthesis for breast cancer survivors
Nipple shield
Breastfeeding

References

Breastfeeding
Body fluids
 
Midwifery